Ninth Fleet or 9th fleet may refer to:

 United States Ninth Fleet
 9th Fleet (Imperial Japanese Navy)

See also
 
 
 
 
 Ninth (disambiguation)
 Fleet (disambiguation)
 Eighth Fleet (disambiguation)
 Tenth Fleet (disambiguation)